The Oddball Couple is an animated half-hour Saturday morning show that ran on the ABC TV network from September 6 to December 20, 1975. The show was a production of DePatie-Freleng Enterprises in association with Paramount Television, and was distributed by CBS Television Distribution. It is an adaptation of the  TV series The Odd Couple, which had ended its run that year, after five seasons on ABC.

Overview of series
The Oddball Couple features the misadventures of a dog named Fleabag and cat named Spiffy, who live together under the same roof. Spiffy is an orderly and polite cat who is a stickler for cleanliness and organization, and Fleabag is rude, obnoxious, lazy, untidy and very disorganized. Their disparate personalities are reflected in their housewhich is one-half mansion and one-half dilapidated shackand even in their car, which is half-pristine and half-junker. They have a secretary named Goldie Hound (a play on the name Goldie Hawn) who works in the office they share. The show consists of two segments lasting 10 minutes each.

In the original Odd Couple series, Felix the neat freak was a photographer and slovenly Oscar was a sportswriter. In this series, Spiffy the neatnik is a writer and Fleabag the slob is a photographer.

Cast
 Joe Besser
 Joan Gerber as Goldie
 Bob Holt
 Sarah Kennedy
 Don Messick
 Frank Nelson as Spiffy
 Ginny Tyler
 Frank Welker
 Paul Winchell as Fleabag

Episodes

Production credits
 Story Editor: Bob Ogle
 Writers: Bob Ogle, Joel Kane, David Detiege, Earl Kress, John W. Dunn
 Supervising Director: Lew Marshall
 Animation Directors: Gerry Chiniquy, Robert McKimson
 Storyboard Directors: Bill Perez, Art Leonardi, Jan Green, Gary Hoffman
 Graphic Design: Ric Gonzales, Gary Hoffman, Dick Ung, Al Wilson, Ken Landau, Coral Kerr, Adam Szwejkowski, Susan Scholefield
 Animation: Norm McCabe, Bob Matz, Virgil Ross, Bob Bemiller, Bob Richardson, Jim Davis, Nelson Shin, Bill Numes, Don Williams, Joel Seibel, Bob Bransford, John Freeman, Bill Carney, Warren Batchelder, George Jorgensen, John Gibbs, Bob Goe
 Background Supervised by: Richard H. Thomas
 Backgrounds: Mary O'Loughlin, Don Watson
 Ink and Paint Supervisor: Gertrude Timmins
 Xerography: Greg Marshall
 Film Editors Supervised by: Bob Gillis
 Film Editors: Joe Siracusa, Rick Steward, Allan Potter
 Voices: Paul Winchell, Frank Nelson, Joan Gerber, Frank Welker, Sarah Kennedy, Don Messick, Joe Besser, Ginny Tyler, Bob Holt
 Music by: Doug Goodwin
 Main Title Music Arranged by: Joe Siracusa
 Conducted by: Eric Rodgers
 In Charge of Production: Lee Gunther
 Camera: Ray Lee, Larry Hogan, John Burton Jr.
 Production Mixer: Steve Orr
 Sound by: Producer's Sound Service, Inc.
 This picture has made the jurdisction of I.A.T.S.E., affiliated with A.F.L.-C.L.O.
 © MCMLXXV DePatie-Freleng Productions, Inc. All rights reserved.
 Based Upon the Play "The Odd Couple" by Neil Simon
 Produced by: David H. DePatie & Friz Freleng
 DFE Films · A DePatie-Freleng Production

Home media
This series was released on DVD from CBS via Amazon's CreateSpace on December 30, 2017.

References

External links
 
 

American Broadcasting Company original programming
1970s American animated television series
1975 American television series debuts
1975 American television series endings
Television series by DePatie–Freleng Enterprises
Television series by CBS Studios
English-language television shows
The Odd Couple
Television series based on works by Neil Simon
American animated television spin-offs
American children's animated comedy television series
Animated television series about cats
Animated television series about dogs